Two Friends (stylized as 2 Friends) is a 1986 Australian television drama film directed by Jane Campion. It was screened in the Un Certain Regard section at the 1986 Cannes Film Festival. The film is Campion’s first feature as a director.

Plot 
The film begins in the present and works backward in time to show how Louise and Kelly, once inseparable best friends, grew apart over the course of a year. Louise is a studious high school student and has a typical love-hate relationship with her divorced mother. Kelly, who has bleached hair and identifies with the punk style, lives with friends at the beach and experiments with drugs and casual relationships. The film progressively shows the subtle changes that set the two girls on different paths.

Cast
 Kris Bidenko as Kelly
 Emma Coles as Louise
 Kris McQuade as Janet, Louise's mother
 Peter Hehir as Malcolm
 Kerry Dwyer as Alison
 Stephen Leeder as Jim
 Debra May as Chris, Kelly's mother
 John Sheerin as Dead Girl's Father
 Sean Travers as Matthew
 Emily Stocker as Soula
 Lynne Murphy as School Principal
 Giovanni Marangoni as Renato
 Benny Ulizzi as Sam
 Rory Delaney as Wally

Release 
The film was selected to screen in the Un Certain Regard section at the 1986 Cannes Film Festival. It later aired as a telefilm on Australian TV on 26 September 1986. The film was also given a two-week limited theatrical run in New York on 24 April 1996.

Reception 
The film was positively reviewed and has a rating of 100% based on eight reviews on website Rotten Tomatoes. Writing of the 1996 US theatrical release, critic Alison Macor of The Austin Chronicle wrote Two Friends is “a spare film with complex and subtly developed relationships…[and] features nuanced performances that suggest the more developed characterizations that resound so effectively in Campion's acclaimed later films Angel at My Table and The Piano.”

In a retrospective essay for Senses of Cinema, Gwendolyn Audrey Foster wrote, “What makes the film so remarkable is the depth of feeling that inhabits the work. Campion doesn’t miss the smallest detail, from telephone calls that go on too long; to bullying by students at school; to other, minor characters whose fates we will ever know; parents who have no idea who their child really is.”

Accolades
The film won three 1987 AACTA Awards including "Best Telefeature" category for producer Jan Chapman, "Best Achievement in direction in a telefeature" for Jane Campion, and "Best Screenplay in a Telefeature" for Helen Garner. Emma Coles and Kris McQuade were both nominated in the category of "Best Performance by an Actress in a Telefeature.”

References

External links

Two Friends at AllMovie
Two Friends at CombustibleCelluloid.com
Two Friends at Oz Movies

1986 independent films
1986 films
1986 drama films
Australian drama television films
Films directed by Jane Campion
Australian independent films
1980s female buddy films
1980s feminist films
1980s coming-of-age drama films